The Mud is a river of Baden-Württemberg and Bavaria, Germany. It flows into the river Main near Miltenberg.

See also
List of rivers of Baden-Württemberg

References

Rivers of Baden-Württemberg
Rivers of Germany